Fiona Fidler (born 1974) is an Australian professor and lecturer with interests in meta-research, reproducibility, open science, reasoning and decision making and statistical practice. She has held research positions at several universities and across disciplines in conjunction with Australian Research Council (ARC) Centres of Excellence.

Education
Fidler completed a Bachelor of Psychology (Hons) with majors in Psychology and Sociology at James Cook University of North Queensland in 1994. In 2006 she completed a PhD in the Department of History and Philosophy of Science at the University of Melbourne. Her thesis topic was From Statistical Significance to Effect Estimation: Statistical Reform in Psychology, Medicine and Ecology.

Career
Fidler states her main interest is in "how scientists and other experts reason, make and justify decisions, and change their minds."

She has a continuing focus on "statistical controversies, for example, the ongoing debate over Null Hypothesis Significance Testing versus Estimation (Effect Sizes, Confidence Intervals) and arguments about Frequentists versus Bayesian statistics."

Fidler has been active in promoting the credibility of research and discussion around the "reproducibility crisis". She has written or co-written a number of articles concerning scientific uncertainty.

From 2007 to 2010 Fidler was an Australian Research Council (ARC) Postdoctoral Fellow in the School of Psychological Science at La Trobe University. Then from 2011 to 2014 she was senior research fellow in the Centre of Excellence for Biosecurity Risk Assessment (CEBRA) and the ARC Centre of Excellence in Environmental Decisions (CEED) at The University of Melbourne where she worked on various expert judgement projects.

in 2015 Fidler received an ARC Future Fellowship to explore reproducibility and open science in conservation science. She took up a position at the University of Melbourne jointly in the School of BioSciences (as part of the quantitative and applied ecology group, QAEco) and the School of Historical and Philosophical Studies (as part of the History and Philosophy of Science program, HPS). In her QAEco position her research focuses on "reproducibility, the ability to replicate an experiment or study and its outcomes...She will be on the lookout for publication bias, p-hacking, cherry picking and HARKing (Hypothesizing After the Results are Known) in the discipline, all indicators of poor reproducibility."

Fidler has continuing collaborations with the Interdisciplinary Conservation Science Research Group at RMIT University.

She has also been part of The University of Melbourne’s team, known as SWARM (Smartly-assembled Wiki-style Argument Marshalling) which received a grant from US intelligence community’s research arm, the Intelligence Advanced Research Projects Activity (IARPA) as part of four-and-a-half year project known as CREATE (Crowdsourcing Evidence, Argumentation, Thinking and Evaluation). The SWARM team developed new ways to support better reasoned argument leading to better collective results and also examined explore using algorithms to identify a participant’s “reasoning profile” . Fidler left the project at the end of phase1.

Fidler leads the Interdisciplinary Meta-Research Group (IMeRG) at the University of Melbourne. This group uses scientific methodology to study science. It has interests in reproducibility (Replication), replicability, and transparency in all fields of science. In 2019 IMeRG launched the repliCATS  (replicating Collaborative Assessment for Trustworthy Science) study. Using the IDEA protocol which utilises the power of group discussion, participants will make structured judgements about the credibility of 3,000 published social scientific research claims. The IDEA protocol "is a structured protocol for eliciting expert judgments based on the Delphi process. IDEA stands for Investigate, Discuss, Estimate, Aggregate." Google scholar identifies a total of 5462 citations in her career and 1025 in 2019.

Personal life 
Fidler was born in 1974 in Townsville, North Queensland. She has two children.

References 

1974 births
University of Melbourne alumni
Living people
Australian scientists